Shooting at the Moon may refer to:

Shooting at the Moon (album)
Shooting at the Moon (film)
Shooting at the Moon (book)

Or Shooting the Moon

Shooting the Moon (hearts)